In Islam, nikah is a contract between two people. Both the groom and the bride are to consent to the marriage of their own free wills. A formal, binding contract – verbal or on paper – is considered integral to a religiously valid Islamic marriage, and outlines the rights and responsibilities of the groom and bride. Divorce in Islam can take a variety of forms, some executed by a husband personally and some executed by a religious court on behalf of a plaintiff wife who is successful in her legal divorce petition for valid cause. Islamic marital jurisprudence allows Muslim men to be married to multiple women (a practice known as polygyny).

There is also Nikah Misyar, a non-temporary marriage with the removal of some conditions such as living together, permitted by some Sunni scholars.

Terminology 
In Islamic law, marriage – or more specifically, the marriage contract –  is called , which already in the Quran is used exclusively to refer to the contract of marriage. In the Hans Wehr Dictionary of Modern Written Arabic,  is defined as "marriage; marriage contract; matrimony, wedlock". (In some marriages in some predominantly Muslim cultures such as in Pakistani culture, there may be a delay between the nikkah and the actual enjoinment of the couple. This is called rukhsati in desi culture— i.e. when the wife leaves her family's home to move in with her husband, having been assured that her husband has obtained a good job and home and has received her mahr. This should not be confused with Islamic tradition though, as it is a distinctly cultural practice).

In Arabic-speaking countries, marriage is commonly called zawāj (from the Quranic term zawj, referring to a member of a pair), and this term has recently gained currency among Muslim speakers of other languages as well. The marriage celebration may be called ʿurs / zawāj, ezdewaj/arusi (Persian), shaadi (Urdu), biye/biya (Bengali) or düğün (Turkish).

History

In Arabia before the advent of Islam in the 7th century CE, a variety of different marriage practices existed. The most common and recognized types of marriage at this time consisted of: marriage by agreement, marriage by capture, marriage by mahr, marriage by inheritance, and "Mot'a" or temporary marriage. In Mesopotamia, marriages were generally monogamous, except among royalty, who would have harems consisting of wives and concubines. The Sasanian society followed Zoroastrianism, which viewed women to be possessions in marriage, although consent was required in both marriage and divorce.

According to Islamic sources, most women in the pre-7th century Arabia had little control over their marriages. They were rarely bound by contract for marriage or custody of children and their consent was rarely sought. Women were seldom allowed to divorce their husbands and their view was not regarded for either a marriage or divorce. However, in the transitional age from non-Islamic to Islamic society, elite women could divorce and remarry without stigma. They were given the power to negotiate the terms of their marriage contract, and could even initiate divorce.

Reforms with Islam

Muhammad had reformed the laws and procedures of the common marriage practices that existed during his prophethood. The rules of "marriage by agreement (marriage through consent)" were reformed and a strict set of rules and regulations were put in place. The practice of "marriage by inheritance" was forbidden. Several chapters and verses from the Quran were revealed which banned such practices.

Under the Arabian Jahiliyyah law, Islamic sources allege that no limitations were set on men's rights to marry or to obtain a divorce. Islamic law limited men to four wives at one time, not including concubines. (Quran 4:3)  The institution of marriage was refined into one in which the woman was somewhat of an interested partner. 'For example, the dowry, previously regarded as a bride-price paid to the father, became a nuptial gift retained by the wife as part of her personal property' Under Islamic law, marriage was no longer viewed as a "status" but rather as a "contract". The essential elements of the marriage contract were now an offer by the man, an acceptance by the woman, and the performance of such conditions as the payment of dowry. The woman's consent, given either actively or by silence, was required. Furthermore, the offer and acceptance had to be made in the presence of at least two witnesses.

Encouragement
As in many religions, marriage is encouraged in Islam, family life is considered a "blessing" and a source of stability. One source lists five Quranic verses (Q.24:32, 25:74, 40:8, 30:21, 5:5) encouraging marriage to "discourage immorality". A BBC page for GCSE WJEC (secondary education) religious studies states, "For Muslims, marriage was created by Allah to provide a foundation for family life and the whole of society."

Conditions

Islamic marriages require acceptance, of the groom, the bride and the consent of the custodian of the bride. The wali of the bride is normally a male relative of the bride, preferably her father. The wali can only be a free Muslim, unless the bride is of the Christian or Jewish faith; in such cases the bride should be given away by someone from her religious background. The bride is normally present at the signing of the marriage contract.

The  is a technical term of Islamic law which denotes the guardian of a bride. In this context, it is meant that the silence of the bride is considered consent. In most schools of Islamic law, only the father or the paternal grandfather of the bride can be .

The marital contract is also often signed by the bride. The consent of the bride is mandatory. It is not required, though customary, that the person marrying the couple should be religiously well-founded in knowledge. The bridegroom can deliver the sermon himself in the presence of representatives of both sides if he is religiously educated, as the story goes about Imam Muhammad bin Ali around 829 AD. It is typically followed by a celebratory reception in line with the couple's or local customs, which could either last a couple of hours or precede the wedding and conclude several days after the ceremony.

Quran 24:33 tells believers to keep their chastity if they do not marry. Quran 24:32 asserts that marriage is a legitimate way to satisfy one's sexual desire. Islam recognizes the value of sex and companionship and advocates marriage as the foundation for families and channeling the fulfillment of a base need. Marriage is highly valued and regarded as being half of one's faith, according to a saying of Muhammad.

Prerequisites

There are several conditions for an Islamic marriage to take place:

Once a  has been ascertained with the realization that it is an obligation of a Muslim husband, the groom is required to pay it to the bride at the time of marriage unless he and his bride can mutually agree to delay the time of some of its payment. In 2003, Rubya Mehdi published an article in which the culture of mahr among Muslims was thoroughly reviewed. There is no concept of dowry as such in Islam. A dowry as such is a payment to the groom from the bride's family and is not an Islamic custom. Bride prices are also expressly prohibited.
 Another requisite of marriage is chastity. No fornicator has the right to marry a chaste partner except if the two purify themselves of this sin by sincere repentance.
 Marriage is permitted for a man with a chaste woman either Muslim or from the People of the Book (Arabic Ahl al Kitab, Jews, Sabians and Christians) but not to polytheists (or "idolaters": Yusuf Ali translation or "idolatresses": Pickthall translation). For women, marriage to People of the Book is not explicitly stated as permissible.
 Spoken consent of the woman is only required if she is not a virgin and her  is neither her father nor her paternal grandfather. But a virgin may not be married off without her permission. If she is too shy to express her opinion her silence will be considered as implicit agreement [Al Bukhari:6968]. Binti Khudham says that when she became a widow her father solemnized her marriage. She did not like the decision so she went to Muhammad, who gave her permission to revoke her marriage. Hence, forced marriages are against Islamic teachings, and those forced into marriages before they have come of age have the right to contest them once they do.
 The importance of the wali is debated between the different schools of thought. To the Hanafi Sunnis, a male guardian is not required for the bride to become married, even if it is her first marriage. Therefore, the marriage contract is signed between the bride and the groom, not the groom and the wali.

Rights and obligations of spouses

According to Islam, both men and women have rights over each other when they enter into a marriage contract, with the husband serving as protector and supporter of the family most of the time, from his means. This guardianship has two aspects for both partners:
 According to one interpretation, the husband must be financially responsible for the welfare and maintenance of his wife or wives and any children they produce, to include at a minimum, providing a home, food, and clothing. In return, it is the duty of the wife to safeguard the husband's possessions and protect how wealth is spent. If the wife has wealth in her own capacity she is not obliged to spend it upon the husband or children, as she can own property and assets in her own right, so the husband has no right for her property and assets except by her wishes.

Several commentators have stated that the superiority of a husband over his wife is relative, and the obedience of the wife is also restrictive.

Women are also reminded that in case the husband is not fulfilling his responsibilities, there is no stigma on them in seeking divorce. "Where the husband has been abusive or neglectful of his responsibilities, he does not have the right to take his wife's property in exchange for her freedom from him. Unfortunately, most couples refuse to go to the judge and binding arbitration for these issues even though the Quran says:" And if you fear a breach between them, then appoint an arbiter from his folk and an arbiter from her folk. If they (the arbiters) desire reconciliation, Allah will affect it between them. Surely, Allah is All-Knowing, All-Aware."

Mahr, dowry and gifts

 (donatio propter nuptias) differs from a marriage dowry or gift, in that it is mandatory for a Muslim marriage and is paid by the groom to the bride. The  does not have to be money, but it must have monetary value. Therefore, "it cannot be love, honesty, being faithful, etc., which are anyway traits of righteous people." If the marriage contract fails to contain an exact, specified mahr, the husband must still pay the wife a judicially determined sum.

Such an agreement does not make the full amount of the mahr any less legally required, nor is the husband's obligation to fulfill the agreement waived or lessened while he fulfills his obligations to reasonably house, feed, or cloth the wife (and any children produced from the union) during the marriage.

Quran [4:4] "You shall give the women their due dowries, equitably."

Quran [5:5] "Today, all good food is made lawful for you. The food of the people of the scripture is lawful for you. Also, you may marry the chaste women among the believers, as well as the chaste women among the followers of previous scripture, provided you pay them their due dowries. You shall maintain chastity, not committing adultery, nor taking secret lovers. Anyone who rejects faith, all his work will be in vain, and in the Hereafter he will be with the losers."

Quran [60:10] "O you who believe, when believing women (abandon the enemy and) ask for asylum with you, you shall test them. GOD is fully aware of their belief. Once you establish that they are believers, you shall not return them to the disbelievers. They are not lawful to remain married to them, nor shall the disbelievers be allowed to marry them. Give back the dowries that the disbelievers have paid. You commit no error by marrying them, so long as you pay them their due dowries. Do not keep disbelieving wives (if they wish to join the enemy). You may ask them for the dowry you had paid, and they may ask for what they paid. This is GOD's rule; He rules among you. GOD is Omniscient, Most Wise."

Marriage contracts and forced/un-consented marriages
The marriage contract is concluded between the wali (guardian) of the bride and the bridegroom and bride. The wali of the bride can only be a free Muslim. The wali of the bride is normally a male relative of the bride, preferably her father. According to most scholars, if the bride is a virgin, the wali mujbir can not force the bride into the marriage against her proclaimed will. Furthermore, according to Khomeini<ref>Risalah-ye Towzihul Masaael-e Imam Khomeini. (Persian and Arabic). Title translation: Imam Khomeini's Islamic Laws Explanation Book . Niloofaraaneh Publications. With the cooperation of Mosol, Gorgan and Ebadorrahmaan Publications. 18th print. 2011. . Bibliographical data ."Pages 375 & 376. Marriage Contract Requirements and Conditions. Question No. 2370. Translation: "Marriage contract and marriage agreement have several requirements: First,.... Fifth, Woman and man [must] be content to the marriage and must be willing for it; but, if the woman, in appearance (apparently), gives permission reluctantly and it is obvious and known that she is content to the marriage inly (= in heart), the contract and agreement are valid"</ref> and Ali al-Sistani, both of whom are Shi'ite scholars (having the degrees mujtahid and marja'), and also almost all contemporary scholars, the marriage is invalid without the bride's free consent and no obligation can make marriage official and legal.Marriage (Part I of II) | Islamic Laws | Books on Islam and Muslims | Al-Islam.org. Permalink

A notable example of this is the Hanafi school (the largest of the four classical schools of Islamic thought), which holds that a bride's permission is required if she has reached puberty. They also hold that if a bride was forced into marriage before reaching puberty, then upon attaining puberty she has the option to nullify the marriage if she wishes. A wali other than the father or the paternal grandfather of the bride, then called wali mukhtar, needs the consent of the bride. If the bride is silent about the issue, i.e. her wali expressed his intention to marry her off to a certain man, and she did not object to it, then consent is assumed via her lack of objection.

Abu Hurayrah reported that the Prophet said: "A non-virgin woman may not be married without her command, and a virgin may not be married without her permission; and it is permission enough for her is to remain silent (because of her natural shyness)." (Al-Bukhari:6455, Muslim & Others).

It is reported in a Hadith that A'ishah related that she asked the Prophet : "In the case of a young girl whose parents marry her off, should her permission be sought or not?" He replied: "Yes, she must give her permission." She then said: "But a virgin would be shy, O Messenger of Allaah!" He replied: "Her silence is [considered as] her permission." (Al-Bukhari, Muslim, & Others)

International human rights responses

Children in some  Muslim sub-cultures who defy their parents' wishes may in practice, suffer penalties supported by the community. International awareness, campaigns and organizations such as the U.K.'s Forced Marriage Unit have recognized the severity of this human rights issue and their rescue and support services extend beyond the borders of U.K. territories. Some countries have instituted prison time for parents who try to coerce their children into such unions.

Divorce

Divorce in Islam can take a variety of forms, some initiated by the husband and some initiated by the wife. The theory and practice of divorce in the Islamic world have varied according to time and place. Historically, the rules of divorce were governed by the Sharia, as interpreted by traditional Islamic jurisprudence, and they differed depending on the legal school. Historical practice sometimes diverged from legal theory. In modern times, as personal status (family) laws were codified, they generally remained "within the orbit of Islamic law", but control over the norms of divorce shifted from traditional jurists to the state.

Hanafi/Ottoman rules on divorce were fragile and complex. The husband in repudiating his wife could declare an irrevocable or revocable divorce. The irrevocable divorce was immediate and the women could not be remarried until after a specific waiting period. An example of a waiting period would be having to wait for three menstrual circles from the time of the divorce. Or, if the husband died, the woman must wait four months and ten days after his death. If the woman was pregnant, she must wait until after the child is born. If the divorce was revocable, the divorce is not final until after the waiting period. However, they could remarry if it was a revocable divorce. Many couples did get remarried after a revocable divorce.

The women's ability to divorce was much different and much more limited. If the woman finds out the husband has some disease or is impotent, the judge gives the husband a year to consummate the marriage before divorce is allowed. Also, the women can divorce by using the "option of puberty" in which the women would have to provide witnesses of the menstrual blood. Finally, a woman could use the "hul", which is a Turkish word, for divorce. This is when the woman asks the husband for a divorce and he repudiates her for consideration. After that, essentially it is trading property for the person.

The Qur'an encourages cooperation in marriage, this is done by giving specific rules to follow. One verse says "Consort with them honorably; or if you are averse to them, it is possible you may be averse to a thing, and God set in it much good". Divorce could lead to women losing their morality or purity if certain values were not followed correctly. The Qur'an exemplifies that divorce is not meant to be the man getting back at the woman. It is to allow the man and the women to peacefully spit up for the good of each other. They also allow for multiple remarriages between the same couple. The couple can divorce and get back together up to two times but after the second remarriage, the divorce is final and there are not more remarriages allowed.

To revisit the rights of divorcing and who has them and does not have them, the reason the man typically gets the right to divorce is that his judgment is thought to be more balanced than the woman. Again, the only reason the woman can ask for a divorce is if there is something significantly wrong with the man. Divorce was supposed to be reserved for last case scenarios and not something that was used for harm. The Qur'an says "Divorce must be pronounced twice and then (a woman) must be retained in honor or released in kindness", which exemplifies that it was supposed to be honorable for both man and woman if it needed to be done. It was not taken lightly and it was a big decision on both party's part.

Prohibited marriages

In certain sections of the Jahiliyyah Arab tradition, the son could inherit his deceased father's other wives (i.e. not his own mother) as a wife. The Quran prohibited this practice. Marriage between people related in some way is subject to prohibitions based on three kinds of relationship. The following prohibitions are given from the male perspective for brevity; the analogous counterparts apply from the female perspective; e.g., for "aunt" read "uncle". The Quran states:

Prohibitions based on consanguinity
Seven relations are prohibited because of consanguinity, i.e. kinship or relationship by blood, viz. mothers, daughters, sisters, paternal aunts, maternal aunts, and nieces (whether sister's or brother's daughters). In this case, no distinction is made between full and half relations, both being equally prohibited. Distinction is however made with step relations i.e. where both the biological mother and father of a couple wishing to marry are separate individuals for both parties, in which case it is permitted. The word "mother" also connotes the "father's mother" and "mother's mother" all the way up. Likewise, the word "daughter" also includes the "son's daughter" and "daughter's daughter" all the way down. The sister of the maternal grandfather and of the paternal grandmother (great aunts) are also included on an equal basis in the application of the directive.

Prohibitions based on suckling

Marriage to what is sometimes described as foster relations in English are not permitted, although the concept of "fosterage" is not the same as is implied by the English word. The relationship is that formed by suckling from the breast of a wet nurse. This is what is meant by "fosterage" in Islam in the quotation below. In Islam, the infant is regarded as having the same degree of affinity to the wet nurse as in consanguinity, so when the child grows up marriage is prohibited to those related to the wet nurse by the same degree as if to the child's own mother.

A hadith (reports) confirm that fosterage does not happen by a chance suckling, it refers to the first two years of a child's life before it is weaned.Al-Bukhari, Al-Jami‘ al-sahih, 912 (no. 5102)"Every relationship which is prohibited (for marriage) owing to consanguinity is also prohibited owing to fosterage" Malik ibn Anas, Al-Mu’atta, 395-396, (no. 1887) Islahi writes that "this relationship is established only with the full intent of those involved. It only comes into being after it is planned and is well thought of".

Prohibitions based on marriage
The daughter-in-law is prohibited for the father, and the mother-in-law, the wife's daughter, the wife's sister and daughters of the wife's siblings (nieces), the maternal and paternal aunts of the wife are all prohibited for the husband. However, these are conditional prohibitions:
 Only the daughter of that wife is prohibited with whom one has had conjugal contact.
 Only the daughter-in-law of a real son is prohibited.
 The sister of a wife, her maternal and paternal aunts, and her brother's or sister's daughters (nieces) are only prohibited if the wife is in wedlock with the husband.

Prohibition based on religion

The Quran states:

Interfaith marriages are recognized between Muslims and Non-Muslim People of the Book (usually enumerated as Jews, Christians, and Sabians). Historically, in Islamic culture and traditional Islamic law Muslim women have been forbidden from marrying Christian or Jewish men, whereas Muslim men have been permitted to marry Christian or Jewish women. It is lawful for Muslim men to marry Jewish or Christian women but not a polytheist woman (Quran 5:5).

Prohibited marriage partners
 Marriage between a man and his sister, half-sister, foster sister, mother, stepmother, foster mother, wife's mother, aunt, grandmother, great aunt, great-grandmother, etc.
 Marriage between a woman and her father, stepfather, husband's biological father, uncle, grandfather, great uncle, great-grandfather, etc.
 Marriage of a man with women who are sisters or stepsisters or foster sisters of each other (except if marrying one who was separated from her husband by divorce or death)
Marriage of a man with women who are sisters or stepsisters of his mother or father.

Polygamy
According to the Sharia (Law), Muslims are allowed to practice polygyny. According to the Quran, a man may have up to four legal wives only if there is a fear of being unjust to non-married orphan girls. Even then, the husband is required to treat all wives equally. If a man fears that he will not be able to meet these conditions then he is not allowed more than one wife.

A bride-to-be may include terms in her marriage contract that require monogamy for her husband or require her consent before he marries another wife.

Sororal polygyny
Sororal polygyny is forbidden. A man cannot marry:
 two sisters
 a woman and a descendant of her sibling
 a woman and sibling of her ancestor

Iddah

A woman cannot marry after divorce or the death of her husband for a certain period. This period is known as iddah.
 A divorcee cannot marry for three menstrual cycles after divorce
 A divorcee who has no courses cannot marry for three months
 A pregnant woman cannot marry until she gives birth
 A widow cannot remarry for four lunar months and ten days

Modern implementations
In today's world, Muslims practice Islamic marital laws in a multitude of ways all over the globe. In the United States, for example, 95% of Muslim American couples included in a 2012 study by the Institute for Social Policy and Understanding had completed both the Nikkah and had obtained a civil marriage license, which is required to have a marriage legally recognized in the United States. The study also shares that “In some cases, the Islamic marriage contract is completed once the couple has decided to get married, but cohabitation occurs later after the wedding reception. In other cases, the Islamic marriage contract is completed simultaneously with the civil marriage and is followed immediately by the wedding reception.”

There is ongoing debate about whether or not Sharia should be recognized in western countries like the United States and Australia that would allow for the Nikkah to be recognized as a legally valid marriage. There are also other elements to the Islamic marriage rituals that have difficulty being acknowledged in courts, according to the study, including the Mahr, or the dowry. Women who are denied their dowry do not have a clear path to legal contestation in either the US or Canada.

Studies have also shown that even young Muslim Americans who might describe themselves as "not very religious" embrace the rituals of their faith at important moments of transition – birth, death, and marriage. These occasions motivate reaffirmation of emotional and behavioral touchstones, even for those who do not practice their faith by attending mosque, praying or fasting regularly.

When it comes to divorce, the 2014 study conducted by the Institute for Social Policy and Understanding states that, "Two divorce rates commonly cited for American Muslims include 32.33% and 21.3%, respectively." Within the United States and Canada, many Muslim couples interviewed in the study mention that they value a religious divorce and its proceedings. Some turn to religious figures to help them navigate the divorce process, while many still go through the courts to terminate the civil marriage. Divorced Muslim women today also face the stigmas associated with being divorced within the North American Muslim community that can make it difficult for them seek remarriage.

Gender roles and ideas about marriage have also shifted since the early onset of Islam when many of the rules around marriage were established. ISPU reports that "the most frequent source of marital conflict in this study was conflict over changing gender roles and expectations," citing a nation-wide increase in women in higher education and professional jobs over the past three decades, and says that they “In many cases are trying to integrate childrearing and family life with professional goals”.

In March 2017, Salamet Memetimin, an ethnic Uyghur and the Communist Party secretary for Chaka township's Bekchan village in Qira County, Hotan Prefecture, Xinjiang, China, was relieved of her duties for taking her nikah marriage vows at her home. In interviews with Radio Free Asia'' in 2020, residents and officials of Shufu County (Kona Sheher), Kashgar Prefecture (Kashi) stated that it was no longer possible to perform traditional Uyghur nikah marriage rites in the country.

See also

 Islamic marital practices
 Islamic sexual jurisprudence
 Kafa'ah, compatibility of prospective spouses
 Minangkabau marriage, marriage practices of West Sumatra, Indonesia
 Nafaqah, "expense"; financial obligations of the husband
 Nikah halala, the marriage of a woman to a second man after a triple talaq (divorce)
 Nikah mutʿah or Zawāj mutʿah, "pleasure marriage"; a fixed-term marriage in Shi'ite Islam, also known as sigeh or sigheh in Iran
 Nikah 'urfi, a "customary" Sunni Muslim marriage contract
 Polygamy in Islam
 Rada (fiqh), prohibited marriage due to fosterage (Islamic) or suckling
 Walima, a marriage banquet offered by the groom the day after the signing of the marriage contract

References

Further reading

 
 Pirzada, Hafsa. Islam, Culture, and Marriage Consent: Hanafi Jurisprudence and the Pashtun Context. Switzerland, Springer International Publishing AG, 2022.

 

ms:Nikah
ur:نکاح

seven 7